Nikola Nimac (born 8 December 1981) is a Croatian skeleton racer who has competed since 2002. He finished 26th in the men's skeleton at the 2006 Winter Olympics in Turin.

References
 
 
 
 

1981 births
Living people
Croatian male skeleton racers
Olympic skeleton racers of Croatia
Skeleton racers at the 2006 Winter Olympics
20th-century Croatian people
21st-century Croatian people